William M. Straus (born June 26, 1956 in East Orange, New Jersey) is a member of the Massachusetts House of Representatives. He represents the 10th Bristol District comprising the towns of Fairhaven; New Bedford: Ward 3: Precinct A, Ward 4: Precincts D, E; Marion; Mattapoisett; and Rochester.

Education and early career
Representative Straus received his B.A. degree from Middlebury College in 1978 and his J.D. degree from the Georgetown University Law Center in 1982. He received a Masters in Public Administration from the Kennedy School of Government at Harvard University.  From 1978 to 1981 he worked for former U.S. Senator John Culver (D-Iowa).  From 1982 to 1988 he was an Assistant District Attorney in Bristol County, Massachusetts.  He later served as a member of the Massachusetts Hazardous Waste Facilities Site Safety Council and the Mattapoisett Conservation Commission.

State representative
Representative Straus currently serves as the Chairman of the Joint Committee on Transportation.  In the 2009-2010 legislative term Representative Straus serves as the Chairman of the Joint Committee on Environment and Agriculture.  During the 2005-2006 term of the Massachusetts Legislature he was a member of the Joint Committees on the Environment, Consumer Protection and Bonding-Capital Expenditures.  In prior sessions of the Legislature he has served as Vice Chairman of the Transportation Committee and as Chairman of the Committee on Election Laws.

Straus has been very involved in the South Coast Rail project through his work on the Joint Committee on Transportation. He has also filed legislation to make public the MBTA pension system finances. Representative Straus also vote in favor of the 2011 law that authorized casino gambling in Massachusetts.

See also
 2019–2020 Massachusetts legislature
 2021–2022 Massachusetts legislature

References

External links
William Straus' Campaign Website

Massachusetts lawyers
Democratic Party members of the Massachusetts House of Representatives
Middlebury College alumni
Georgetown University Law Center alumni
Harvard Kennedy School alumni
People from Mattapoisett, Massachusetts
1956 births
Living people
21st-century American politicians
Politicians from East Orange, New Jersey